Logan Costa (born 1 April 2001) is a professional footballer who plays as a centre-back for  club Toulouse. Born in France, he plays for the Cape Verde national team.

Early life 
Costa was born in Saint-Denis, Île-de-France, in a family of Cape Verdean descent.

Club career 
Having started to play football in Argenteuil, Val-d'Oise, Logan Costa joined Reims's youth academy in 2016.

A player in Reims's Championnat National 2 reserve starting in the 2018–19 season, Costa captained the side during the following campaign. With a few appearances in the pro squad for the Ligue 1 games, he was loaned to Championnat National side Le Mans for the 2020–21 season.

With Le Mans newly-relegated from Ligue 2, he was one of the standout players in the team, and a revelation of the Championnat National, starting and playing the entirety of 26 games, as the club only narrowly missed the promotion play-offs.

After this promising loan spell, Costa was offered a contract extension by Reims, but chose to look elsewhere in search of more game time. With one year left on his contract, several clubs from France, Italy and Germany were interested by the young centre-back, but he was eventually transferred to the Toulouse in August 2021.

Costa made his professional debut for Toulouse on 13 November 2021, starting and playing every minute of a penalty shoot-out victory over Libourne in the Coupe de France, in which he helped his team keep a clean sheet. Starting the season behind Rasmus Nicolaisen, Bafodé Diakité and Anthony Rouault, with a team aiming for promotion, Costa first only made bench appearances in Ligue 2. However, he established himself as a regular starter in the Coupe de France, even scoring his first goal against Trélissac.

International career 
An international with France under-16s and under-17s, Costa was also selected for the French under-19s and under-20s, without playing any official games in a period where most of them where canceled due to COVID-19.

On 16 March 2022, he received his first international call-up for the Cape Verde national team. He debuted with Cape Verde in a 2–0 friendly win over Guadeloupe.

Honours 
Toulouse

 Ligue 2: 2021–22

References

External links

FFF Profile

2001 births
Living people
Sportspeople from Saint-Denis, Seine-Saint-Denis
Cape Verdean footballers
Cape Verde international footballers
French footballers
France youth international footballers
French sportspeople of Cape Verdean descent
Association football defenders
Toulouse FC players
Ligue 1 players
Ligue 2 players
Championnat National 2 players
Championnat National 3 players
Footballers from Seine-Saint-Denis